The list of ship decommissionings in 1876 includes a chronological list of all ships decommissioned in 1876.


See also

References

1876
 Ship decommissionings